Polo was introduced in the Summer Olympics at the 1900 Games. It was contested in another four Olympiads before being removed from the official programme after the 1936 Summer Olympics.

Polo declined in relative popularity around the time of World War II due at least in part to the logistical and financial difficulties of competing in the sport. In 1996, the International Olympic Committee voted to classify polo as a recognized sport.

Polo was accepted as a demonstration sport for the 2018 Summer Youth Olympics.

Events

Tournaments

Medal table by nation
Sources:

Teams by nation

See also
List of Olympic venues in discontinued events

References

 
Discontinued sports at the Summer Olympics